Robert Sowards (born June 9, 1968) is an American professional golfer.

Sowards was born in Portsmouth, Ohio. He played collegiate golf at Glenville State College. He turned professional in 1991.

Sowards has worked as a club pro and has played on professional tours. He played on the Nationwide Tour in 1998 and 2009. He earned his PGA Tour card through the 2007 qualifying school and was a rookie in 2008. His best finish was a T-9 in the Wyndham Championship.

Tournament wins
this list may be incomplete
1996 Southern Ohio PGA Championship
2000 Southern Ohio PGA Championship
2001 Southern Ohio PGA Championship
2002 Ohio Open, Southern Ohio PGA Championship
2003 Southern Ohio PGA Championship
2004 PGA Club Professional Championship, Ohio Open
2010 Ohio Open

Results in major championships

CUT = missed the half-way cut
Note: Sowards only played in the PGA Championship.

Results in senior major championships

"T" indicates a tie for a place

NT = No tournament due to COVID-19 pandemic

U.S. national team appearances
PGA Cup: 2005, 2013 (tie), 2015, 2019 (winners)

See also
2007 PGA Tour Qualifying School graduates

External links
Profile from 2004 PGA Championship

American male golfers
PGA Tour golfers
Golfers from Ohio
Glenville State College alumni
People from Portsmouth, Ohio
1968 births
Living people